The Jaki Byard Experience is an album by jazz pianist Jaki Byard, originally released on the Prestige label in 1968, featuring performances by Byard with Roland Kirk, Richard Davis and Alan Dawson.

Reception
The Allmusic review by Scott Yanow awarded the album five out of five stars and states: "Pianist Jaki Byard and the wondrous Roland Kirk (here switching between tenor, clarinet, and manzello) were two of the few jazz musicians who could play in literally every jazz style, from New Orleans to bop and free form. If only they had recorded a history-of-jazz album. Fortunately, they did meet up on a few occasions, including this brilliant quartet session".

Track listing
 "Parisian Thoroughfare" (Bud Powell) – 10:05  
 "Hazy Eve" (Jaki Byard) – 4:34  
 "Shine on Me" (Traditional) – 4:16  
 "Evidence" (Thelonious Monk) – 4:24  
 "Memories of You" (Eubie Blake, Andy Razaf) – 7:13  
 "Teach Me Tonight" (Sammy Cahn, Gene DePaul) – 5:23  
Recorded in New York on September 17, 1968

Personnel
Jaki Byard: piano
Roland Kirk: tenor saxophone, manzello, clarinet, whistle, kirkbam
Richard Davis: bass
Alan Dawson: drums

References

1968 albums
Prestige Records albums
Jaki Byard albums
Albums produced by Don Schlitten